Pine Level, North Carolina may refer to:

Pine Level, Columbus County, North Carolina, Columbus County
Pine Level, Johnston County, North Carolina